The 1969 Southern Conference men's basketball tournament took place from February 27 to March 1, 1969, at the original Charlotte Coliseum in Charlotte, North Carolina. The Davidson Wildcats, led by head coach Lefty Driesell, won their third Southern Conference title and received the automatic berth to the 1969 NCAA tournament.

Format
All of the conference's eight members were eligible for the tournament. Teams were seeded based on conference winning percentage. The tournament used a preset bracket consisting of three rounds.

Bracket

* Overtime game

See also
List of Southern Conference men's basketball champions

References

Tournament
Southern Conference men's basketball tournament
Southern Conference men's basketball tournament
Southern Conference men's basketball tournament
Southern Conference men's basketball tournament
Basketball competitions in Charlotte, North Carolina
College sports tournaments in North Carolina
College basketball in North Carolina